The College of Medicine and Public Health, Ubon Ratchathani University is a medical and public health school in Warin Chamrap District, Ubon Ratchathani Province, Thailand.

History 
The College of Medicine and Public Health, Ubon Ratchathani University was founded on 17 December 2002, following a meeting with Sunpasithiprasong Hospital, the Faculty of Medicine, Khon Kaen University and Ubon Ratchathani University, with the goal of increasing the provision of education for medical and healthcare personnel in the South Isan region. On 8 November 2003, the Medical Doctor (MD) course was approved by the Medical Council of Thailand and in 2005, the BSc in Public Health course was approved as well.

Teaching hospitals 

 Ubon Ratchathani University Hospital
 Sunpasitthiprasong Hospital (CPIRD), Ubon Ratchathani Province
 Sisaket Hospital (CPIRD), Sisaket Province

See also 

 List of medical schools in Thailand

References 

This article incorporates material from the corresponding article in the Thai Wikipedia.

Medical schools in Thailand
University departments in Thailand
Ubon Ratchathani University